Star Sports Network (formerly ESPN Star Sports) was an East Asian pay television sports channel broadcast to Mainland China and South Korea, operated by Fox Networks Group Asia Pacific, a subsidiary of The Walt Disney Company (Southeast Asia). It was previously part of the Fox Sports operations in East and Southeast Asia (formerly ESPN Star Sports), but this version retained Star Sports name; ESPN Mainland China was instead renamed Star Sports 2.

History
Hong Kong-based Star TV launched Prime Sports (later renamed Star Sports) in partnership with American company TCI, which owned Prime-branded regional sports channels. The channel was broadcast across Asia, as with the footprint of AsiaSat 1. Star TV have since regionalised the channel with a number of versions, including a dedicated version for Taiwan. Later, ESPN have joined in the region as a competitor to Star Sports.

In October 1996, ESPN and Star Sports have agreed to combine their operations across Asia. As a result, a joint venture named, ESPN Star Sports was formed, to be headquartered in Singapore.

In June 2012, it was announced that News Corporation would buy ESPN International's share in ESPN Star Sports. Following the News Corporation take over, ESPN all over Asia would be relaunched as Fox Sports but the relaunch of ESPN Star Sports as Fox Sports did not affect much of East Asia, as Star Sports continued to broadcast in Mainland China and South Korea kept the brand, and instead, the version of ESPN for Mainland China was renamed as Star Sports 2 on 10 January 2014.

Alongside 16 other channels owned by Disney, the two Star Sports channels was shut down on October 1, 2021, after which the channel spaces created by Prime Sports Asia in 1991 and ESPN Asia in 1992, both folded and ceased to exist.

Channels
 Star Sports 1
 Star Sports 2: This channel was not available in South Korea only in Mainland China.

Programming
Sporting events covered by Star Sports include:

Australian Rules Football
 Australian Football League

Baseball
 Major League Baseball: 
 Select spring training and regular season games (home games only and select road games)
 ESPN Major League Baseball (Sunday Night Baseball and select special games, tie-breaker and Home Run Derby)
 MLB All-Star Game (MLB International feed)
 Postseason (wild card, Division Series and Championship Series)
 World Series (MLB International feed)
 World Baseball Classic
 Korea Baseball Organization (ESPN feed)

Basketball
 US NCAA Men's College Basketball (Fox College Hoops)
 BIG3

Boxing
 Versus
 World Boxing Matches

Bull Riding 
 Professional Bull Riders events

Cricket 

 ICC
Cricket World Cup
 Under-19 Cricket World Cup (all matches available on Fox+, highlights and live coverage of final on television)
 Women's Cricket World Cup

Football
 AFC Champions League (from play-offs, for West Zone play-offs until quarter finals)
AFC U-19 Championship
AFC U-16 Championship
AFC Futsal Championship
AFC Futsal Club Championship 
Danish Super League (one match per week, 2019–2021 (originally from June 2020 with the remaining matches in 2019–20))
DBU Pokalen (three matches (both semi finals and a final) in 2019–20)

Golf
 The Masters Tournament
 U.S. Open Championship
 The Open Championship
 PGA Championship 
 PGA EuroPro Tour
 ANA Inspiration
 United States Women's Open Championship (golf)
 Women's PGA Championship 
 Ricoh Women's British Open
 The Evian Championship
 Ladies European Tour (Highlights only)
 LPGA Tour

Kickboxing
 Kunlun Fight

Mixed Martial Arts
 Ultimate Fighting Championship

Motorsports
 Formula One
 FIA Formula 2 Championship
 FIA Formula 3 Championship
 FIM Motocross World Championship
 Superbike World Championship 
 World Touring Car Cup (only for highlights)
 MotoGP
 WeatherTech SportsCar Championship
 FIA World Endurance Championship (only for highlights)
 IndyCar Series 
 Formula E
 Supercars Championship

Rugby

Union 
Global Rapid Rugby

Tennis
 Australian Open
 French Open
 Wimbledon
 US Open
Fed Cup (final only)
 ATP Cup
 Laver Cup
 Hawaii Open

News
SportsCenter
ESPN FC

See also
 Fox Sports Asia
 Star Sports (Indian TV network)
 Fox Sports' (and previously ESPN Star Sports') partnership in South Korea, past and present:
 JTBC3 Fox Sports
 SBS ESPN
 MBC ESPN

References

External links
  for TV listings

Star Sports
Prime Sports
ESPN media outlets
Disney television networks
Television channels and stations established in 1991
Television channels and stations disestablished in 2021